Goffs may refer to:

Places
 Goffs, California, settlement in at southeast edge of Mojave National Preserve
 Goffs, West Virginia, an unincorporated community
 Goffs, Nova Scotia, rural community in Canada

Other
 Goffs School; comprehensive secondary school and sixth form college in Cheshunt, Hertfordshire, United Kingdom

See also
 Goff (disambiguation)
 Goffs Oak, village in Hertfordshire, United Kingdom
 Goff's Caye, island of Belize